Some Night, Somewhere is a live album by The Blackeyed Susans, given away with copies of Mouth To Mouth sold around December, 1996 as a Christmas bonus disc. It was recorded live at the Continental Café in Melbourne and was a limited edition CD.

Track listing 
All songs written by Phil Kakulas, except where noted.

 "Sheets Of Rain" – 4:35
 "Let’s Live" (Phil Kakulas, Rob Snarski) – 5:15
 "Mary Mac" – 3:51
 "I Can’t Find Your Pulse" (Rob Snarski, Phil Kakulas) – 5:28
 "I Need You" (Rob Snarski) – 3:48
 "Glory, Glory" – 4:52
 "She Breathes In (She Breathes Out)" (Phil Kakulas, Rob Snarski) – 5:19
 "A Curse On You" (Phil Kakulas, David McComb, Graham Lee) – 3:58

Personnel 
 Rob Snarski – vocals, guitars
 Phil Kakulas – bass
 Kiernan Box – organ, piano
 Dan Luscombe – guitar, backing vocals
 Mark Dawson – drums
 Kathy Wemyss – trumpet, backing vocals on track 6

References

The Blackeyed Susans albums
1996 live albums